Maurice Ekpenyong is the founder of Political Africa Initiative (POLAF) and is a former Chief of Staff of the Nigerian National Assembly (House of Representatives).

He commenced his career as an officer in the Nigerian Navy, resigning as a Lieutenant Commander. During his career, he served in ECOMOG and UN Missions in Liberia, Sierra Leone, and the Guinea. He was later appointed Head of Administration, Office of the Speaker, National Assembly and later Chief of Staff, House of Representatives Nigeria, a position he held until June 2011. He is co-founder of Malami Leadership Foundation (MLFDN,) as well as Political Africa Initiative (POLAF), organisations initiated to promote Africa’s younger generation for elective political leadership. He joined the board of ALMAT Group, a Real Estate Management firm based out of New York, USA, in 2011.

Educational qualifications include graduate of the Nigerian Defence Academy – B.Eng Electronics; Naval Engineering College; Weapons Engr; University of Lagos- Masters in International Law and Diplomacy; Carl Vinson Institute of Government, University of Georgia – Strategic Management; RIPA International- Executive Management/Leadership for Administrators; Stanford University- MBA.
He is a member of organizational bodies such as the International Who is Who Historical Society; African Leadership Network (ALN); United States Naval Institute (USNI); American Society for Industrial Security (ASIS); Smithsonian Institution; Africa 2.0 Initiative.

External links
 Nigeria National Assembly
 Political Africa Initiative (POLAF) official website
 Malami Foundation official website

Living people
Nigerian politicians
Year of birth missing (living people)